The holothurins are a group of toxins originally isolated from the sea cucumber Actinopyga agassizii. They are contained within clusters of sticky threads called Cuvierian tubules which are expelled from the sea cucumber as a mode of self-defence. The holothurins belong to the class of compounds known as saponins and are anionic surfactants which can cause red blood cells to rupture. The holothurins can be toxic to humans if ingested in high amounts.

Pharmacology

Effects on nerves
Holothurin is shown to have a blocking effect on nerves in desheathed bullfrog sciatic nerve and rat phrenic nerve preparations, and its potency can be compared to that of cocaine, procaine, and physostigmine. Unlike the other mentioned blocking agents, the disrupting effect of holothurin appears to be quite irreversible upon washing.

In another experiment on frog sciatic nerve, holothurin A is shown to be capable of destroying electrical excitability of a node of Ranvier along with basophilic macromolecular material found in and near the cytoplasm of the node. In another experiment on rat phrenic nerve, the nerve-disrupting effect of holothurin A is found to be preventable when specific concentrations of physostigmine are present.

Other effects
Holothurin A and holothurin A1, along with other sea cucumber saponins, are found to reduce weight gain in mice. They improve glucose tolerance, reduce levels of lipids in blood and liver, and inhibit the absorption of lipids in the intestine. They also inhibit the activity of pancreatic lipase, decrease the growth of white adipocytes, a factor which contributes to obesity, and stimulate the production of LXR-β nuclear receptor and ABCA1 protein. These findings suggest a possibility of the holothurins and other sea cucumber saponins being used in the development of anti-obesity drug.

The holothurins are shown to have anti-melanogenic and anti-wrinkling effects on human skin by inhibiting melanin production in Melan-A cells and promoting collagen production in human dermal fibroblasts via the ERK pathway.

References

Further reading

Saponins
Sulfate esters
Tetrahydrofurans